St. Florian's Church is a Roman Catholic church at Upper Square in Ljubljana, the capital of Slovenia. It was completed in 1696. It is a local church that belongs to St. James's Parish.

External links

Roman Catholic churches in Ljubljana
Center District, Ljubljana
Roman Catholic churches completed in 1696
17th-century Roman Catholic church buildings in Slovenia
Baroque church buildings in Slovenia
1696 establishments in the Holy Roman Empire